Aesculetin (also known as esculetin, 6,7-dihydroxycoumarin and cichorigenin) is a derivative of coumarin. It is a natural lactone that derives from the intramolecular cyclization of a cinnamic acid derivative.

It is present in chicory and in many toxic and medicinal plants, in form of glycosides and caffeic acid conjugates.

This compound is used in some sunscreens, but there is evidence that it acts as a photosensitizer for DNA damage. The sodium salt of its methyl-derivative is used in dermatology for the treatment of varicose veins.

It is a blue fluorescence compound found in plants. Aesculin, the glucoside of aesculetin, will fluoresce under long wave ultraviolet light (360 nm). The hydrolysis of aesculin results in loss of this fluorescence. Aesculetin has the ability to quench the inner fluorescence of bovine serum albumin.

Aesculetin can be transformed into scopoletin (7-hydroxy-6-methoxycoumarin) and isoscopoletin (6-hydroxy-7-methoxycoumarin) through incubation with rat liver catechol-O-methyltransferase.

Aesculetin can be synthesized by condensation of hydroxyhydroquinone triacetate with malonic acid in concentrated sulfuric acid.

See also 
 Umbelliferone

References 

Coumarins
Catechols